Adenanthos gracilipes is a shrub of the family Proteaceae native to Western Australia.

References

Eudicots of Western Australia
gracilipes
Plants described in 1974